Onychomyrmex hedleyi is a species of ant in the genus Onychomyrmex, which is endemic to Australia. Described by Emery in 1895, the ant is known to have similar behaviours to Army ants.

References

External links

Amblyoponinae
Hymenoptera of Australia
Insects of Australia
Insects described in 1895